The 2019 USL League One season was the inaugural season of USL League One. The regular season consisted of a 28–game schedule that began on March 29 and concluded on October 5. The playoffs began on October 12 with the final match of the postseason on October 19.

Teams

Managerial changes

League table

Results table

Playoffs

Semifinals

USL League One Championship  
<onlyinclude>

Championship Game MVP: Arturo Rodríguez (North Texas SC)

Attendance

Average home attendances
Ranked from highest to lowest average attendance.

Sources: USL Soccer Stadium Digest

Statistical leaders

Top scorers 

Source:

Top assists 

Source:

|}

Clean Sheets

Source:

Hat-tricks

League awards

Individual awards 
 Most Valuable Player:  Arturo Rodriguez (NTX)
 Defender of the Year:  Conner Antley  (TRM)
 Young Player of the Year:  Arturo Rodriguez (NTX)
 Goalkeeper of the Year:  Dallas Jaye (GVL)
 Coach of the Year:  Eric Quill (NTX)
 Golden Boot:  Ronaldo Damus (NTX)
 Assists Champion:  Arturo Rodriguez (NTX)
 Golden Glove:  Dallas Jaye (GVL)
 Goal of the Year:  Mikie Rowe (TRM)
 Save of the Year:  Phillip Ejimadu (TUC)

All-League Teams

See also
 USL League One
 2019 USL Championship season

References

External links
 USL League One official website

 
2019
USL Division 3